Lincoln County is a historic county in the Canadian province of Ontario.

The county was formed in 1792. In 1845, the southern portion of Lincoln County was separated to form Welland County.

In some census and election records from the late 19th century, the townships of Caistor and Gainsborough (which can be seen on the map below) were enumerated as part of Monck County, while Grantham and Niagara Townships were enumerated as part of Niagara County. However, neither Monck nor Niagara ever existed as incorporated municipal counties, but rather as electoral districts.

In 1970, Lincoln and Welland Counties were amalgamated to form the Regional Municipality of Niagara.

See also
List of townships in Ontario

External links
 1951 map of Lincoln County
 1879 map of Lincoln and Welland counties

Former counties in Ontario
History of the Regional Municipality of Niagara
States and territories established in 1792
1792 establishments in Upper Canada
Populated places disestablished in 1970